Osowo may refer to:

Osowo, Gostyń County in Greater Poland Voivodeship (west-central Poland)
Osowo, Września County in Greater Poland Voivodeship (west-central Poland)
Osowo, Złotów County in Greater Poland Voivodeship (west-central Poland)
Osowo, Kościerzyna County in Pomeranian Voivodeship (north Poland)
Osowo, Słupsk County in Pomeranian Voivodeship (north Poland)
Osowo, Warmian-Masurian Voivodeship (north Poland)
Osowo, Goleniów County in West Pomeranian Voivodeship (north-west Poland)
Osowo, Świdwin County in West Pomeranian Voivodeship (north-west Poland)